Cincorunia is a genus of moths belonging to the family Tortricidae.

Species
Cincorunia monstruncus Razowski & Wojtusiak, 2008
Cincorunia uncicornia Razowski & Becker, 2002

See also
List of Tortricidae genera

References

 , 2002, SHILAP revista de lepidopterologia 30: 318.
 , 2005, World Catalogue of Insects 5

External links
tortricidae.com

Euliini
Tortricidae genera